The Mercyhurst Lakers represented Mercyhurst University in CHA women's ice hockey during the 2015-16 NCAA Division I women's ice hockey season. The Lakers were the regular season champions of the College Hockey America Conference (CHA), as well as the CHA Tournament Champions. They were defeated in the NCAA Championship Tournament by #2 Wisconsin.

Standings

Offseason
August 7: Emily Janiga earned her second consecutive invitation to the USA Hockey Women's National Festival in Lake Placid, New York.  The festival shall determine the roster of the Under-22 team that shall compete in a three-game series versus the Canadian U22/Development Squad from Aug. 19-23 in Lake Placid.

Recruiting

Roster

2015–16 Lakers

Schedule

|-
!colspan=12 style=""| Regular Season

  
   
  
|-
!colspan=12 style=""| CHA Tournament
  
  
|-
!colspan=12 style=""| NCAA Tournament

Awards and honors

Rachael Smith, CHA Rookie of the Year
Sarah McDonnell, CHA Goaltender Award
Mike Sisti CHA Coach of the Year
J'Nai Mahadeo, D, All-CHA Second Team
Rachael Smith, F, All-CHA Rookie Team
Molly Blasen, D, All-CHA Rookie Team
Sarah McDonnell, G, All-CHA Rookie Team

References

Mercyhurst
Mercyhurst Lakers women's ice hockey seasons
Mercy
Mercy